Rackenford is a village and civil parish in North Devon, England. It is roughly located 7.31 miles North West of Tiverton and 20 miles South East of Barnstaple

Points Of Interest

All Saints Church
The village church, situated in the middle of the village, previously named Holy Trinity.

Rackenford Club
A private members club located just outside Rackenford on the "Old Rackenford Road"

The Stag Inn
A pub located in the centre of the village opposite the church. It is rumoured to be one of the oldest pubs in Devon and to contain beams from the Mary Rose.
The Stag Inn has been beautifully renovated and reopened in 2018.  Since Covid, it is open for a traditional family Sunday Lunch and special events only.

Nature reserve
Rackenford and Knowstone Moors, a nature reserve of Devon Wildlife Trust,  is near the village.

Population Figures

External links

 Genuki Rackenford page
 http://freepages.genealogy.rootsweb.com/~footprints1/dev1/rackenford/homepage.htm
 Rackenford CofE Primary School
 Rackenford Village Website
 Village shop information

Rackenford